The Nichols House Museum is a museum at 55 Mount Vernon Street on Beacon Hill in Boston, Massachusetts.  The house in which it is located was designed by the architect Charles Bulfinch, and built by Jonathan Mason, the politician, in 1804. The building was renovated in 1830. The museum is named for Rose Standish Nichols (1872–1960), the renowned landscape gardener, suffragist, pacifist, and member of the Cornish Art Colony, who lived in the house between 1885 and 1960. She left the house to be used as a museum after her death. The museum preserves the lifestyle of the American upper class during Nichols' lifetime, with turn-of-the-century period rooms.

References

External links
Museum website

Houses completed in 1804
1804 establishments in Massachusetts
Historic house museums in Massachusetts
Museums in Boston
Beacon Hill, Boston
Houses in Boston
Charles Bulfinch buildings
Federal architecture in Massachusetts
Biographical museums in Massachusetts